Petra Stadium is a multi-use stadium in Amman, Jordan.  It is currently used mostly for football matches. The stadium has a capacity of 6,000 spectators.

References

Football venues in Jordan
Sports venues in Amman